The women's water polo tournament at the 2007 World Aquatics Championships, organised by the FINA, was held in Melbourne, Australia from 19 March to 1 April 2007.

The women's tournament was won by the United States, who beat Australia 6–5 in the final game.

Preliminary round

Group A

Group B

Group C

Group D

Final round

Finals

5th–8th place

9th–12th place

13th–16th place

Medallists

Individual awards

 Most Valuable Player
 

 Best Goalkeeper
 

 Top Scorer
  — 20 goals

References

External links
 FINA Water Polo website
 Melbourne 2007

2007
Water Polo
Women's tournament
2007
2007 in women's water polo
Women's water polo in Australia
2007 in Australian women's sport